Darryl Eugene Spencer (born March 21, 1970) is a former American football wide receiver in the National Football League. He played for the Atlanta Falcons and played college football at Miami.

References

1970 births
Living people
People from Merritt Island, Florida
Players of American football from Florida
American football wide receivers
Miami Hurricanes football players
Atlanta Falcons players